Hugo Budinger (10 June 1927 – 7 October 2017) was a German field hockey player who competed in the 1952 Summer Olympics, in the 1956 Summer Olympics, and in the 1960 Summer Olympics. He was born in Düsseldorf and died in Köln.

References

External links
 

1927 births
2017 deaths
German male field hockey players
Olympic field hockey players of Germany
Olympic field hockey players of the United Team of Germany
Field hockey players at the 1952 Summer Olympics
Field hockey players at the 1956 Summer Olympics
Field hockey players at the 1960 Summer Olympics
Olympic bronze medalists for the United Team of Germany
Olympic medalists in field hockey
Medalists at the 1956 Summer Olympics
Sportspeople from Düsseldorf